The Synagogue of the Uruguayan Jewish Community is a synagogue in Montevideo, Uruguay. The services are conducted by Chief Rabbi Ben-Tzion Spitz.

Overview
The Ashkenazy Jewish Community is present in Montevideo since the first decades of the 20th century. This temple opened its doors in 1981.

See also
 List of synagogues in Uruguay

References

External links
  

Orthodox Judaism in South America
Orthodox synagogues
Synagogues in Montevideo
Centro, Montevideo
Ashkenazi Jewish culture in Uruguay
Synagogues completed in 1981
1980s establishments in Uruguay
Ashkenazi synagogues